Lionel Theron Gates (born March 13, 1982) is a former American football running back. He was originally drafted by the Buffalo Bills in the seventh round of the 2005 NFL Draft. He played college football at Louisville.

High school years
Gates attended Terry Parker High School (Jacksonville, Florida) and was awarded four varsity letters each in football and track. In football, he was chosen twice for the All-Northeast Florida team and was named one of the top Senior Football Players in the state of Florida by FOX.com.

College years
Gates attended University of Louisville, where he split carries with Eric Shelton (Panthers) and finished his college career with 310 rushing attempts for 1,475 yards (4.8 yards per rushing attempt average) and 20 rushing touchdowns, 40 receptions for 469 yards (11.7 yards per receiving average) and 2 receiving touchdowns, and 6 kickoff returns for 92 yards (15.33 yards per kick return average).

References

External links
Tampa Bay Buccaneers bio

1982 births
Living people
Terry Parker High School alumni
Players of American football from Jacksonville, Florida
American football running backs
Louisville Cardinals football players
Buffalo Bills players
Tampa Bay Buccaneers players